Todd Bramble (born 1967) is an American soccer coach.  He is currently the Deputy Athletic Director for Intercollegiate Sports at George Mason.

Education
Bramble received a business management degree from Mercer University in 1989.

Playing career
Bramble played for the Mercer Bears while earning his business management degree.  He was a two time all-conference goalkeeper while playing with the Bears.  Bramble spent one year playing for the Memphis Rogues of the National Professional Soccer League.

Coaching career
Bramble began his coaching career at Brown University where he was an assistant to Trevor Adair for the men's soccer team.  In 1995, Bramble followed Adair to Clemson University to continue as an assistant coach for the men's team.  In 1999, Bramble was an assistant coach with the USA U-17 team in the World Championships.  After his international experience, Bramble spent 1 season as the head coach of the Butler Bulldogs men's soccer team.  In 2011, he returned to Clemson University to coach their women's soccer team. Bramble replaced Ray Leone as head coach. Bramble spent seven years as head coach at Clemson.  The women's team made an appearance in the NCAA Tournament in each of his 7 seasons there.  Bramble left Clemson after the 2007 season to become head coach at the University of Alabama. Bramble coached the Alabama Crimson Tide women's soccer team for seven seasons before leaving in 2014 to become the head coach of the women's soccer team at George Mason University.  Bramble left his post as George Mason women's soccer coach in June 2021, when he was named Deputy Athletic Director for Intercollegiate Sports at George Mason.

Administrative career
After the retirement of Kevin McNamee as Deputy Athletic Director at George Mason, Bramble was named the Deputy Athletic Director for Intercollegiate Sports.

Personal life
Bramble has two children: Cole (son) and Morgan (daughter).

References

External links

Living people
George Mason Patriots women's soccer coaches
Butler Bulldogs men's soccer coaches
Clemson Tigers women's soccer coaches
Alabama Crimson Tide women's soccer coaches
1967 births
Mercer Bears men's soccer players
Brown Bears men's soccer coaches
American soccer coaches
Memphis Rogues players
National Professional Soccer League (1984–2001) players
Clemson Tigers men's soccer coaches
Soccer players from Atlanta
American soccer players
Association football goalkeepers